The Grammy Award for Best Rock Instrumental Performance was an honor presented to recording artists for quality instrumental rock performances at the Grammy Awards, a ceremony that was established in 1958 and originally called the Gramophone Awards. Honors in several categories are presented at the ceremony annually by the National Academy of Recording Arts and Sciences of the United States to "honor artistic achievement, technical proficiency and overall excellence in the recording industry, without regard to album sales or chart position".

The award was first presented at the 22nd Grammy Awards in 1980 to Paul McCartney and the band Wings for "Rockestra Theme". From 1986 to 1989, the category was known as Best Rock Instrumental Performance (Orchestra, Group or Soloist). According to the category description guide for the 52nd Grammy Awards, the award is presented to artists "for newly recorded rock, hard rock or metal instrumental performances".

As of 2023, Jeff Beck holds the records for the most wins, with six. Sting has received three awards, twice as a member of The Police—although he had no part in the band's "Behind My Camel", the 1982 award winner which he did not write and on which he refused to play.

Two-time recipients include Eric Clapton, Carlos Santana (once as a member of the band Santana), The Flaming Lips, Steve Vai, and brothers Jimmie Vaughan and Stevie Ray Vaughan (each once as part of the duo Vaughan Brothers). At the 51st Grammy Awards (2009), the tribute act Zappa Plays Zappa (led by Dweezil Zappa, son of Frank Zappa) earned an award for their performance of Frank's instrumental song "Peaches en Regalia". Dweezil and Frank have both received multiple nominations and even competed against one another in 1988. Joe Satriani holds the record for the most nominations (as well as the record for the most nominations without a win), with fourteen.

The award was discontinued before the 2012 awards due to a major overhaul of Grammy categories. All instrumental performances in the rock category were shifted to either the newly formed Best Rock Performance or Best Hard Rock/Metal Performance categories.

Recipients

 Each year is linked to the article about the Grammy Awards held that year.

See also

 List of Grammy Award categories
 List of instrumental bands
 List of rock instrumentals

References

General
  Note: User must select the "Rock" category as the genre under the search feature.
 

Specific

External links
Official site of the Grammy Awards

 
1991 establishments in the United States
2011 disestablishments in the United States
Awards disestablished in 2011
Awards established in 1991
Rock Instrumental